Bembidarenas is a genus of ground beetles in the family Carabidae. There are at least two described species in Bembidarenas, found in South America.

Species
These two species belong to the genus Bembidarenas:
 Bembidarenas reicheellus (Csiki, 1928)  (Chile)
 Bembidarenas setiventris Nègre, 1973  (Argentina)

References

Trechinae